Rui Machado was the defending champion, but decided not to participate.

Thomas Schoorel won his second Challenger title, defeating Filippo Volandri 6–2, 7–6(7–4) in the final.

Seeds

Draw

Finals

Top half

Bottom half

References
 Main Draw
 Qualifying Draw

Tennis Napoli Cup - Singles
2011 Singles